The electoral district of Toombul was a Legislative Assembly electorate in the state of Queensland, Australia.

History
Toombul was created by the redistribution of 1887, taking effect at the 1888 colonial election, and existed until the 1932 state election. It was based on the north-east suburbs of Brisbane between Breakfast Creek and Kedron Brook from Newmarket and Alderley to Moreton Bay, formerly part of the electorate of Enoggera.

When Toombul was abolished in 1932, its area was incorporated into the districts of Hamilton and Nundah.

Members

The following people were elected in the seat of Toombul:

Russell subsequently represented Hamilton (1932–1941).

References

Former electoral districts of Queensland
1888 establishments in Australia
1932 disestablishments in Australia
Constituencies established in 1888
Constituencies established in 1932